Nu metal (sometimes stylized as nü-metal, sometimes called aggro-metal) is a subgenre of  that combines elements of heavy metal music with elements of other music genres such as hip hop, alternative rock, funk, industrial, and grunge. Nu metal bands have drawn elements and influences from a variety of musical styles, including multiple genres of heavy metal. Nu metal rarely features guitar solos or other displays of musical technique; the genre is heavily syncopated and based on guitar riffs. Many nu metal guitarists use seven-string guitars that are down-tuned to produce a heavier sound. DJs are occasionally featured in nu metal to provide instrumentation such as sampling, turntable scratching and electronic backgrounds. Vocal styles in nu metal include singing, rapping, screaming and growling. Nu metal is one of the key genres of the new wave of American heavy metal.

Nu metal became popular in the late 1990s with bands and artists such as Korn, Limp Bizkit, Slipknot and Kid Rock all releasing albums that sold millions of copies. Nu metal's popularity continued during the early 2000s, with bands such as Papa Roach, Staind, and P.O.D. all selling multi-platinum albums, and came to a peak with Linkin Park's diamond-selling album Hybrid Theory, which became the best-selling rock album of the 21st century. However, by the mid-2000s, the oversaturation of bands combined with the underperformance of several high-profile releases led to nu metal's decline, leading to the rise of metalcore and many nu metal bands disbanding or abandoning their established sound in favor of other genres.

During the 2010s, there was a nu metal revival; many bands that combine nu metal with other genres (for example, metalcore and deathcore) emerged, and some nu metal bands from the 1990s and early 2000s returned to the nu metal sound. Bands like Of Mice & Men, Emmure, Issues and My Ticket Home combined nu metal with metalcore or deathcore. Artists like Grimes, Poppy and Rina Sawayama integrated nu metal sounds into electronic pop music in the late 2010s and early 2020s.

Characteristics and fashion

Terminology and origins
Nu metal is also known as nü-metal and aggro-metal. It is a subgenre of alternative metal. MTV states that the early nu metal group Korn "arrived in 1993 into the burgeoning alternative metal scene, which would morph into nü-metal the way college rock became alternative rock." Stereogum has similarly claimed that nu metal was a "weird outgrowth of the Lollapalooza-era alt-metal scene". Nu metal merges elements of heavy metal music with elements of other music genres such as hip hop, and alternative rock.

Nu metal bands have been influenced by and have used elements of a variety of musical genres, including electronic music, funk, gothic rock, hardcore punk, punk rock, dance music, new wave, jazz, post-punk, symphonic rock and synth-pop. Nu metal bands also are influenced by and use elements of genres of heavy metal music such as death metal, rap metal, groove metal, funk metal, and thrash metal. Some nu metal bands, such as Static-X and Dope, made nu metal music with elements of industrial metal. In contrast with other heavy metal subgenres, nu metal tends to use the same structure of verses, choruses and bridges as those in pop music.

Musical characteristics

Instrumentation

Nu metal is heavily syncopated and is based mostly on guitar riffs. Mid-song bridges and a general lack of guitar solos contrasts it with other genres of heavy metal. Kory Grow of Revolver wrote, "... [i]n its efforts to tune down and simplify riffs,  effectively drove a stake through the heart of the guitar solo". Another contrast with other heavy metal genres is nu metal's emphasis on rhythm, rather than on complexity or mood, often its rhythm sounds like that of groove metal. The wah pedal is occasionally featured in nu metal music. Nu metal guitar riffs occasionally are similar to those of death metal.

Nu metal bassists and drummers are often influenced by funk and hip hop, respectively, adding to nu metal's rhythmic nature. Blast beats, which are common in heavy metal subgenres such as black metal and death metal, are extremely rare in nu metal. Nu metal's similarities with many heavy metal subgenres include its use of common time, distorted guitars, power chords and note structures primarily revolving around Dorian, Aeolian or Phrygian modes. While loud and heavily distorted electric guitars are a core feature of all metal genres, nu metal guitarists took the sounds of "violence and destruction" to new levels with their overdriven guitar tone, which music journalists Kitts and Tolinski compared to the "...sound [of] a Mack truck being crushed by a collapsing skyscraper."

Some nu metal bands use seven-string guitars that are generally down-tuned, rather than traditional  Likewise, some bass guitarists use five-string and six-string instruments.  in nu metal often features an emphasis on funk elements. In nu metal music, DJs are sometimes featured to provide instrumentation such as sampling, turntable scratching and electronic backgrounds.  tends to have hip hop grooves and rhythms.

Vocals

Vocal styles used in nu metal music include singing, rapping, screaming and growling. Vocals in nu metal are often rhythmic and influenced by hip hop. While some nu metal bands, such as Limp Bizkit and Linkin Park, have rapping in their music, other nu metal bands, such as Godsmack and Staind, do not.

Nu metal bands occasionally feature hip hop musicians as guests in their songs; Korn's song "Children of the Korn" features the rapper Ice Cube, who performed on the band's 1998 Family Values Tour. The hip hop musician Nas was featured on Korn's song "Play Me", which is on the band's album Take a Look in the Mirror. Limp Bizkit has recorded with multiple hip hop musicians including Method Man, Lil Wayne, Xzibit, Redman, DMX and Snoop Dogg. Linkin Park collaborated with hip hop musician Jay-Z on their 2004 extended play Collision Course. Kid Rock has recorded with hip hop musicians Eminem and Snoop Dogg. Trevor Baker of The Guardian wrote, "Bands such as Linkin Park, Korn and even the much reviled Limp Bizkit ... did far more to break down the artificial barriers between 'urban music' and rock than any of their more critically acceptable counterparts."

Lyrics
Lyrics in nu metal songs are often angry or nihilistic; many of the genre's lyrics focus on topics such as pain, angst, bullying, emotional issues, abandonment, betrayal, and personal alienation, in a way similar to those of grunge. Many nu metal lyrics that are about these topics tend to be in a very direct tone. However, some  songs have lyrics that are about other topics. P.O.D. have used positive lyrics about promise and hope. The nu metal song "Bodies" by Drowning Pool is about moshing. The Michigan Daily wrote about Limp Bizkit's lyrics, writing that the band "used the nu-metal sound as a way to spin testosterone fueled fantasies into snarky white-boy rap. Oddly, audiences took frontman Fred Durst more seriously than he wanted, failing to see the intentional silliness in many of his songs". Limp Bizkit's lyrics also have been described as misogynistic. Dope's lyrics are usually about sex, drugs, parties, women, violence and relationships. In contrast, according to Josh Chesler of the Phoenix New Times, the lyrics of Deftones, who were once considered a nu metal band, "tend to have complex allusions and leave the songs open to many different interpretations."

Fashion

Nu metal clothing typically consists of baggy pants, shirts, and shorts, JNCO jeans, Adidas tracksuits, sports jerseys, baseball caps, baggy hoodies, cargo pants, and sweatpants. Nu metal hairstyles and facial hairstyles include dreadlocks, braids, spiky hair, chin beards, bald heads, goatees, frosted tips, and bleached or dyed hair. Common accessories in nu metal fashion include wallet chains, tattoos, and piercings, especially facial piercings. Nu metal fashion has been compared to hip hop fashion.

Some nu metal bands such as Motograter, Mushroomhead, Mudvayne, and Slipknot wear masks, jumpsuits, costumes, face paint, corpse paint or body paint. A few nu metal bands, such as Coal Chamber, Evanescence, Kittie, and Jack off Jill are known for having gothic appearances.

History

1980s–1993: Precursors and influences

Many heavy metal, alternative metal, industrial, funk metal, alternative rock, rap metal, and industrial metal artists and bands of the 1980s and early 1990s have been credited with laying groundwork for the development of nu metal by combining heavy guitar riffs with pop music structures and drawing influences from subgenres of heavy metal and other music genres; Faith No More, Primus, Helmet, Boo-Yaa T.R.I.B.E., Tool, Fear Factory, 24-7 Spyz, Hot Dawgz, Fishbone, Biohazard, Suicidal Tendencies, Infectious Grooves, Godflesh, Red Hot Chili Peppers, Jane’s Addiction, Nine Inch Nails, White Zombie, Mr. Bungle, Prong, Rage Against the Machine, and Ministry all have been highlighted as examples of this.

Groove metal and thrash metal bands of the same period such as Machine Head, Sepultura, Metallica, Pantera, Slayer, and Anthrax all have been cited as influential to nu metal as well. For example, Anthrax pioneered the rap metal genre by combining hip hop and rap with heavy metal on their 1987 EP I'm the Man, which laid groundwork for  development. Korn's lead vocalist Jonathan Davis said about Pantera guitarist Dimebag Darrell, "if there was no Dimebag Darrell, there would be no Korn".

In the 1990s, bands described as "neo-metal" by the author Garry Sharpe-Young emerged; these bands include Pantera, Strapping Young Lad, Machine Head, Biohazard and Fear Factory. Sharpe-Young wrote that these bands "had chosen to strip metal down to its raw, primal element" and that "neo-metal paved the way for nu-metal".

Nu metal is often influenced by hip hop. Rappers Dr. Dre and Ice Cube have been a big influence on nu metal pioneers Korn; guitarist Munky said the band were trying to emulate the samples of Dr. Dre's 1992 album The Chronic. Munky and fellow Korn guitarist Head also said they tried to emulate samples by the hip hop group Cypress Hill. Both the Geto Boys and N.W.A. also have been a major influence on Korn. Fred Durst of Limp Bizkit has cited the hip hop group The Fat Boys as a major influence on him. Shifty Shellshock of the nu metal band Crazy Town cited Run–D.M.C. and Beastie Boys as influences. Josey Scott of the nu metal band Saliva cited  LL Cool J, Beastie Boys, Public Enemy, N.W.A., Chuck D, Doug E. Fresh, and Whodini as influences. Sonny Sandoval of the nu metal band P.O.D. cited hip hop groups Boogie Down Productions and Run–D.M.C. as influences. Linkin Park member Mike Shinoda's hip hop influences include Boogie Down Productions, Public Enemy, N.W.A., and the Juice Crew. Chester Bennington, another member of Linkin Park, cited A Tribe Called Quest, KRS-One, Run–D.M.C., Public Enemy, N.W.A., Beastie Boys, and Rob Base as influences. Beastie Boys are a hip hop music group that influenced nu metal. Hip hop group Run–DMC was one of the first groups to combine rap with rock, paving the way for nu metal.

1993–1997: Early development and rise
Joel McIver acknowledged Korn as the band that created and pioneered the nu metal genre with its demo Neidermayer's Mind, which was released in 1993. McIver also acknowledged Korn as the band that started the new wave of American heavy metal, which is a heavy metal music movement that started in the 1990s. The aggressive riffs of Korn, the rapping of Limp Bizkit, and the melodic ballads of Staind created the sonic template for nu metal. The origins of the term "nu metal" are often attributed to the work of producer Ross Robinson, who has been called "The Godfather of Nu Metal" between producers. Robinson has produced for nu metal bands such as Korn, Limp Bizkit and Slipknot. Many of the first nu metal bands, such as Korn and Deftones, came from California; however, the genre soon spread across the United States and many bands arose from various states, including Limp Bizkit from Florida, Staind from Massachusetts, and Slipknot from Iowa. In the book Brave Nu World, Tommy Udo wrote about the nu metal band Coal Chamber, "There's some evidence to suggest that Coal Chamber were the first band to whom the tag 'nu metal' was actually applied, in a live review in Spin magazine."

In 1994, Korn released their self-titled debut album, which is widely considered the first nu metal album. Korn had experienced underground popularity at this time; their debut album peaked at number 72 on the Billboard 200. However, earlier the same year, P.O.D.'s album Snuff the Punk was also released, which was later recognized as the first nu metal album. In 1995, the band Sugar Ray released its debut studio album Lemonade and Brownies, an album described as both funk metal and nu metal. In 1995, Deftones released their debut album Adrenaline. The album peaked at number 23 on the Heatseekers Albums chart on October 5, 1996. Deftones also were temporarily controversial in 1996 when their vocalist Chino Moreno was blamed by TV news reports for a riot that occurred at the 1996 U-Fest festival. Adrenaline was certified gold by the Recording Industry Association of America (RIAA) in the summer of 1999. It was also certified platinum by the RIAA in September 2008.

Sepultura's 1996 album Roots features nu metal elements that were considered influential to the genre, while Roots itself was influenced by Korn's self-titled debut album. Few bands were playing nu metal until 1997 when bands such as Coal Chamber, Limp Bizkit, and Papa Roach all released their debut albums. Attention through MTV and Ozzy Osbourne's 1995 introduction of Ozzfest was integral to the launching of the careers of many nu metal bands, including Limp Bizkit in 1998. Nu metal began to rise in popularity when Korn's 1996 album Life Is Peachy peaked at number 3 on the Billboard 200 and sold 106,000 copies in its first week of release.

1997–2004: Mainstream popularity
Limp Bizkit released their debut album Three Dollar Bill, Y'all in 1997, in what Billboard writer William Goodman calls a "banner year" for the nu metal genre. The album's popularity grew in 1999 as the band's mainstream profile began to increase; in March of that year, it went platinum in the United States, and eventually went double platinum in July 2001. As of October 1999, the album had sold 1.8 million copies in the U.S., according to Nielsen SoundScan. Deftones' album Around the Fur, also released that year, peaked at number 29 on the Billboard 200 on November 15, 1997. The album was certified gold by the Recording Industry Association of America (RIAA) in the summer of 1999, and certified platinum by the RIAA in June 2011.

Also in 1997, Sugar Ray released its second studio album Floored. The album achieved mainstream success very quickly and was certified 2× platinum by the RIAA on February 20, 1998. Although Floored is a nu metal album, the only song from the album that achieved chart success was the song "Fly", which is instead a reggae song. Although Sugar Ray continued to be extremely popular, the band abandoned the nu metal genre and became a pop rock band with its 1999 studio album 14:59.

In 1998, nu metal became one of the most mainstream genres of music when Korn's third album Follow the Leader peaked at number 1 on the Billboard 200, was certified 5× platinum by the RIAA, and paved the way for other nu metal bands. At this point, many nu metal bands were signed to major record labels, and were playing combinations of heavy metal, hip hop, industrial, grunge and hardcore punk styles. Hip hop artists Vanilla Ice and Cypress Hill, along with heavy metal bands Sepultura, Primus, Fear Factory, Machine Head, and Slayer released albums that draw from the nu metal genre. In 1999, Korn's fourth studio album Issues peaked at number 1 on the Billboard 200. The album was certified 3× platinum by the RIAA in one month. The album sold at least 573,000 copies in its first week of release. During the late 1990s and early 2000s, multiple nu metal bands such as Korn, Limp Bizkit and P.O.D. appeared repeatedly on MTV's Total Request Live.

The Woodstock 1999 festival featured multiple nu metal artists and bands such as Korn, Kid Rock, Godsmack, Limp Bizkit and Sevendust. During and after Limp Bizkit's performance at the festival, violence occurred and people tore plywood from the walls during the performance of the band's song "Break Stuff". Several sexual assaults were reported to have happened during the festival; a rape that was reported during Limp Bizkit's performance, and gang rape was reported to have occurred during Korn's set at the festival. Despite the incidents at the festival, Limp Bizkit's popularity and the sales of their then-recent album Significant Other were not affected. The album peaked at number 1 on the Billboard 200, selling 643,874 copies in its first week of release, topping over one million sold in two weeks, and eventually being certified 7× platinum in 2001. Significant Other sold at least 7,237,123 copies in the United States.

Other nu metal bands began to emerge or achieve mainstream popularity in 1999. Godsmack's self-titled debut album was released in 1998 and was certified 4× platinum. In April 1999, Kid Rock's album Devil Without a Cause was certified by gold by the RIAA. The following month, Devil Without a Cause, as Kid Rock predicted, went platinum. Eventually, the album sold at least 9,300,000 copies in the United States and was certified 11× platinum. In 1999, Slipknot emerged with an extremely heavy nu metal sound, releasing their self-titled album, which was certified platinum in 2000 and 2× platinum in 2005. In a review of the band's self-titled album, Rick Anderson of AllMusic wrote about Slipknot, "You thought Limp Bizkit was hard? They're the Osmonds. These guys are something else entirely." Anderson noted the death metal influence on the album. Slipknot drummer Joey Jordison, noted by Anderson for his death metal-influenced drumming, said of Slipknot's music: "The roots are death metal, thrash, speed metal, and I could go on and on about all those bands."

In 1999, Staind's second album Dysfunction was released; the track "Mudshovel" peaked at number 10 on the Mainstream Rock chart. Dysfunction was certified platinum by the RIAA in 2000 and 2× platinum in 2004. In 2000, Limp Bizkit's third studio album Chocolate Starfish and the Hot Dog Flavored Water set a record for highest week-one sales of a rock album, selling over 1,000,000 copies in the United States in its first week of release—400,000 of which sold on its first day of release, making it the fastest-selling rock album ever and breaking the world record held for seven years by Pearl Jam's Vs. Chocolate Starfish and the Hot Dog Flavored Water by Limp Bizkit was certified 6× platinum by the RIAA. That same year, both Papa Roach's second studio album Infest and Disturbed's debut studio album The Sickness were released. Both albums became multi-platinum hits. In 2000,  P.O.D.'s album The Fundamental Elements of Southtown went platinum in the United States and was the 143rd best-selling album of 2000. The album's song "Rock the Party (Off the Hook)" went to number 1 on MTV's Total Request Live. At the turn of the millennium at the time, many nu metal bands performed at Ozzfest, including Kittie, Disturbed, Mudvayne, Linkin Park, Slipknot, Papa Roach, Otep, Static-X, Methods of Mayhem, Taproot and Drowning Pool. Ozzfest was successful, with Ozzfest 2000, for example, selling out and having 19,000 audience members. During that same year, nu metal bands like Papa Roach and Limp Bizkit joined rappers like Eminem and Xzibit on Eminem's Anger Management Tour, which had sold-out concerts.

Late in 2000, Linkin Park released their debut album Hybrid Theory, which was the best-selling debut album by any artist of any genre in the 21st century. The album was also the best-selling album of 2001, selling more than albums such as Celebrity by NSYNC and Hot Shot by Shaggy. Linkin Park earned a Grammy Award for their second single "Crawling". Their fourth single, "In the End", was released late in 2001 and peaked at number 2 on the Billboard Hot 100 in March 2002. In 2001, Linkin Park's album Hybrid Theory sold 4,800,000 copies in the United States, making it the highest-selling album of the year. Linkin Park's album Hybrid Theory was certified 12× platinum (diamond) by the RIAA and sold at least 10,222,000 copies in the United States. In 2000, Godsmack released their second studio album Awake, which was certified double platinum. The album's title track peaked at number 1 on the Mainstream Rock chart. Both the album's title track and the song "Sick of Life" have been featured on the United States Navy's television commercials.

Crazy Town's debut album The Gift of Game peaked at number 9 on the Billboard 200, went platinum in February 2001, and sold at least 1,500,000 copies in the United States. Worldwide, the album sold at least 2,500,000 copies. Staind's 2001 album Break the Cycle debuted at number 1 on the Billboard 200 with at least 716,000 copies sold in its first week of release, selling more than albums such as Survivor by Destiny's Child, Lateralus by Tool and Miss E... So Addictive by Missy Elliott. Break the Cycle by Staind was certified 5× platinum by the RIAA, with 4,240,000 copies sold in 2001 in the United States. Although the album featured nu metal tracks, a lot of the album showed Staind moving to a softer sound. Noting Staind's change in style to a softer sound, Tommy Udo of Brave Nu World wrote: "It's often said that nobody over the age of 24 could possibly like Limp Bizkit or Korn, but Staind are a more mainstream band and their songs are likely to appeal to a much bigger fanbase."

In August 2001, Slipknot released their album Iowa, which peaked at number 3 on the Billboard 200 and went platinum in October 2001. Critic John Mulvey called the album the "absolute triumph of nu metal". P.O.D.'s 2001 album Satellite went  and peaked at number 6 on the Billboard 200. P.O.D.'s popularity continued in the year 2002. On June 5, 2001, Drowning Pool released a nu metal album titled Sinner, which features the song "Bodies". The album went platinum on August 23, 2001 and its song "Bodies" became one of the most frequently played videos on MTV for new bands. "Bodies" went to number 6 on the Mainstream Rock chart. In 2001, System of a Down's album Toxicity peaked at number 1 on the Billboard 200. In July 2022, Toxicity was certified 6× platinum by the RIAA. System of a Down blended nu metal with occasional influences of Middle Eastern music, Greek music, Armenian music, and jazz music, and the band featured political lyrics.

In 2003, MTV wrote that nu metal's mainstream popularity was declining, citing that Korn's fifth album Untouchables and Papa Roach's third album Lovehatetragedy both sold less than the bands' previous releases. Korn's lead vocalist Jonathan Davis believed music piracy was the reason for the lower amount of sales of Untouchables compared to Follow the Leader and Issues because Untouchables had been leaked to the Internet more than four months before its official release date. MTV also wrote that nu metal bands were played less frequently on radio stations and MTV began focusing on other musical genres. MTV wrote that Papa Roach's third album Lovehatetragedy has less hip hop elements than the band's previous album Infest and also said that Saliva's 2002 album Back into Your System has less  elements than the band's 2001 album Every Six Seconds. MTV also wrote that Crazy Town's second album Darkhorse had no hit singles and sold less than the band's previous album The Gift of Game. MTV wrote that although Kid Rock's album Cocky had characteristics of the musician's 1998 album Devil Without a Cause, Cocky song "Forever", which featured the style of Kid Rock's  song "Bawitdaba", was not as popular as Cocky country song "Picture". MTV also wrote, "Another cause for nü-metal and rap-rock's slip from the spotlight could be a diluted talent pool caused by so many similar-sounding bands. American Head Charge, Primer 55, Adema, Cold, the Union Underground, Dope, Apartment 26, Hed (Planet Earth) and Skrape—all of whom released albums between 2000 and 2001—left more of a collective impression than individual ones". Despite what MTV wrote, the RIAA certified Korn's album Untouchables platinum in July 2002, and one of the album's singles, "Here to Stay", received a lot of radio play and peaked at number one on MTV's Total Request Live twice. Untouchables sold at least 434,000 copies in first week of release and peaked at number 2 on the Billboard 200. However, Untouchables still did not sell as many copies as Korn's most commercially successful album, Follow the Leader.

Despite the MTV report that nu metal was declining, nu metal remained extremely popular with bands such as Linkin Park, Godsmack, and Evanescence. Linkin Park's remix album Reanimation was released in July 2002 and sold more than a million copies that year, which MTV described as "impressive for a remix album". Canadian newcomers Three Days Grace had also taken a turn in the spotlight of the genre with their hit single I Hate Everything About You peaking at number 4 on the Billboard rock charts during the summer of 2003. Evanescence's debut album Fallen was released in March 2003. Johnny Loftus of AllMusic noted the nu metal sound of the album. Fallen Grammy Award-winning lead single "Bring Me to Life" peaked at number 5 on the Billboard Hot 100 chart and number 1 on the Mainstream Top 40 chart. In 2003, Linkin Park's album Meteora peaked at number 1 on the Billboard 200 and sold at least 810,000 copies in its first week of being released. Meteora by Linkin Park and Fallen by Evanescence ranked third and fourth respectively on the best-selling albums of 2003. Both Linkin Park and Evanescence released high-charting singles throughout 2003 to  Fallen by Evanescence was certified diamond by the RIAA and sold at least 7,600,000 copies in the United States and Meteora by Linkin Park was certified 7x platinum by the RIAA and sold at least 6,100,000 copies in the United States. That same year, Godsmack released their third studio album Faceless, which peaked at number 1 on the Billboard 200 and was certified platinum by the RIAA in its first five weeks of being released. In 2004, Slipknot released their third studio album Vol. 3: (The Subliminal Verses), which peaked at number two on the Billboard album charts.

2004–2014: Decline in popularity and dormancy
After a period of continued success with bands such as Godsmack, Linkin Park and Evanescence, most of nu metal's mainstream popularity sharply declined in 2003 and 2004. Limp Bizkit's 2003 album Results May Vary, which features alternative rock music and  peaked at number 3 on the Billboard 200, with sales of at least 325,000 copies in its first week of being released. In 2004, Blabbermouth.net reported that, according to Nielsen SoundScan, Results May Vary sold 1,337,356 copies in the United States. However, the album garnered very poor critical reception and consequently performed much weaker than previous Limp Bizkit albums such as Significant Other and Chocolate Starfish and the Hot Dog Flavored Water. Korn's 2003 album Take a Look in the Mirror sold less than previous Korn albums like Issues and Untouchables. In 2004, 1970s and 1980s-inspired rock bands such as Jet and The Darkness were achieving mainstream success as the popularity of nu metal declined. During the  the popularity of emo exceeded the declining popularity of nu metal. Also during this time, metalcore, a fusion of extreme metal and hardcore punk, became one of the most popular genres in the new wave of American heavy metal, with the success of bands like Killswitch Engage, Shadows Fall, God Forbid, Unearth, Trivium, and Bullet for My Valentine. Groove metal band Lamb of God also became successful in the heavy metal genre. Stephen Hill of Louder Sound called the rise of metalcore after the decline of nu metal "the metalcore revolution".

In the mid-to-late 2000s, many nu metal bands experimented with other genres and sounds. Linkin Park's third studio album Minutes to Midnight, released in 2007, was noted for its complete departure from the band's nu metal sound. Describing the album's style, singer Chester Bennington stated, "We've really moved away from anything that sounds like nu-metal." Nu metal bands such as Disturbed and Drowning Pool moved to a different sound away from nu metal. Slipknot also departed from their nu metal sound on the 2008 album All Hope Is Gone and included elements of groove metal, death metal and thrash metal into their music. Staind and Papa Roach moved to lighter sounds. Staind's 2003 album 14 Shades of Grey was significantly less heavy than previous albums and shows the band's departure from nu metal and a movement towards a lighter sound. Papa Roach abandoned the nu metal genre with their 2004 album Getting Away with Murder, moving to a hard rock style. System of a Down released two albums in 2005, Mezmerize and Hypnotize. Both did well commercially and critically, but the band took a more alternative metal approach to the two albums compared to their past three efforts. In 2005, Limp Bizkit released a record called The Unquestionable Truth (Part 1) without promoting and advertising the record. The album was not very popular; its sales fell 67% during its second week of release. In 2006, Limp Bizkit went on hiatus. In 2012, vocalist Fred Durst said:

2014–present: Revivals and fusion with other genres

During the mid-2010s, there was a discussion within media of a possible nu metal revival because of bands fusing nu metal with other genres. Despite the lack of radio play and popularity, some nu metal bands recaptured some of their former popularity as they released albums in a nu metal style. Many metalcore and deathcore groups such as My Ticket Home, Stray from the Path, Emmure, Of Mice & Men, Suicide Silence, and Issues, all gained moderate popularity in the 2010s and used elements from nu metal. This fusion has sometimes been referred to as "nu metalcore". Suicide Silence's 2011 album The Black Crown, which features elements of nu metal and deathcore, peaked at number 28 on the Billboard 200. In 2014, Issues' self-titled debut album peaked at number 9 on the same chart. The album features elements of metalcore, nu metal, pop and R&B. Of Mice & Men's 2014 album Restoring Force, which features elements of nu metal, peaked at number 4 on the Billboard 200. Bring Me the Horizon, often described as a metalcore band, released their fifth album That's the Spirit, which peaked at number 2 on the Billboard 200, in 2015. The album draws from multiple genres including nu metal and would experiment further with nu metal on their 2020 album Post Human: Survival Horror. The band's keyboardist has described them as a nu metal band.

A nu metal revival began in the mid-late 2010s, with groups like Blood Youth, Cane Hill Sworn In, DangerKids and Islander. Within this movement, nu metalcore became increasingly prominent through the popularity of groups like Vein.fm, Loathe and Code Orange. According to PopMatters writer Ethan Stewart, Code Orange's 2017 album Forever led to nu metalcore becoming "one of the most prominent flavors of contemporary metal". In contrast, Metal Hammer writer Dannii Leivers cited the aforementioned groups as simply hinting towards a revival, instead claiming a revival began in 2021, "a crop of young revivalists... looking to put a brand-new spin on the music of their formative years", namely Tetrarch. In the mid–late 2010s,  genres like emo rap and trap metal emerged.

Electronic and art pop singer-songwriters incorporated nu metal into their sound in the late 2010s and 2020s. Poppy has incorporated nu metal on her albums Am I a Girl? and I Disagree, Grimes on album Miss Anthropocene and Rina Sawayama on Sawayama. The songs "We Appreciate Power" and "Play Destroy" were pioneering examples. Poppy has described this fusion as "nu-Poppy" or "Poppymetal". I Disagree received critical acclaim for this fusion, with single "Bloodmoney" nominated for the 2021 Grammy Award for Best Metal Performance, making her the first female solo artist to be nominated for the award in its history. Dorian Electra incorporated nu metal influences on their album My Agenda, as did Ashnikko on Demidevil, particularly on single "Cry". The Guardian noted that these mostly female artists have revived nu metal, a mostly male genre, and successfully adapted it to showcase a female perspective. Rina Sawayama said "metal itself lends itself to toxic masculine tropes, but it’s also almost taking the piss out of a very masculine expression of emotion”.

Legacy

Popularity, criticism, and praise
Despite its popularity in the late 1990s and early 2000s, nu metal has often been criticized by many fans of heavy metal music, often being labelled with derogatory terms such as "mallcore" and "whinecore". Gregory Heaney of AllMusic called nu metal "one of metal's more unfortunate pushes into the mainstream". Lucy Jones of NME called nu metal "the worst genre of all time". In Metal: The Definitive Guide : Heavy, NWOBH, Progressive, Thrash, Death ... , Garry Sharpe-Young described  as "a dumbed-down and—thankfully short[-]lived exercise". When Machine Head moved to the nu metal genre with their album The Burning Red and their vocalist Robb Flynn spiked his hair in the fashion of many nu metal musicians, the band were accused of "selling out" and many fans criticized their change of appearance and musical style. Machine Head's drummer Dave McClain said, "Pissing people off isn't a bad thing, you know? For people to be narrow-minded is bad ... [i]t doesn't bother us at all, we know we're going to piss people off with this record, but some people hopefully will actually sit down and listen to the whole record". Robb Flynn, Machine Head's vocalist, said 

Jonathan Davis, the vocalist of Korn, spoke about the criticism of nu metal from heavy metal fans, saying:  Lamb of God's vocalist Randy Blythe criticized the nu metal genre and spoke about its loss of popularity in 2004, saying: "Nu-metal sucks, so that's why that's dying off. And I think... people are ready for angrier music. I think people are ready for something that's real, not, you know, 'I did it all for the nookie.'" Megadeth frontman Dave Mustaine said he would "rather have his eyelids pulled out" than listen to nu metal.

Some musicians who influenced nu metal have tried to distance themselves from the subgenre and its bands. Mike Patton, the vocalist of Faith No More and Mr. Bungle, tried to distance himself from the subgenre and criticized it, even though he is featured on the song "Lookaway" on Sepultura's album Roots, which is often considered a nu metal album. Patton said of his music's influence on nu metal, "I feel no responsibility for that, it's their mothers' fault, not mine". Helmet frontman Page Hamilton said, "It's frustrating that people write [us] off because we're affiliated with or credited with or discredited with creating  and rap metal ... which we sound nothing like".

Although Trent Reznor of Nine Inch Nails has said he knows some Korn members and that he thinks they are "cool guys", he also criticized nu metal, saying:

In response to reports that Fred Durst, lead singer of Limp Bizkit, is a big fan of Tool, the latter's vocalist Maynard James Keenan said, "If the lunch-lady in high school hits on you, you appreciate the compliment, but you're not really gonna start dating the lunch-lady, are ya?" While Durst has cited Rage Against the Machine as a major influence, Rage Against the Machine's bassist Tim Commerford is open about his hatred of Limp Bizkit, describing them as "one of the dumbest bands in the history of music". At the 2000 MTV Video Music Awards, Limp Bizkit won the Best Rock Video category for their song "Break Stuff", beating Rage Against the Machine's "Sleep Now in the Fire". When Limp Bizkit accepted their award, Commerford went on stage and climbed  up a backdrop, rocking back and forth. After the incident, Commerford was arrested and spent a night in jail. Commerford said in 2015, "I do apologize for Limp Bizkit. I really do. I feel really bad that we inspired such bullshit ... They're gone, though. That's the beautiful thing."

Jody MacGregor of FasterLouder called nu metal "music's most hated genre"; conversely, he also wrote that nu metal is "not as bad as people think", praising several examples of the genre. Despite the fact that multiple nu metal musicians rejected the nu metal label, Limp Bizkit's vocalist Fred Durst defended it, saying "Nu metal let people open up and it meant something to people. It really did." Slipknot's vocalist Corey Taylor, also defended nu metal, saying "I’d like to think that that whole nu-metal wave was so important to that next wave of American heavy metal, to be honest." Coal Chamber's vocalist Dez Fafara also defended nu metal. He said he is proud to be associated with the subgenre and that nu metal bands "broke new musical ground" saying, "I think 'hair metal' was cheesy. [But] I think 'nu metal' was different. I think what's beautiful about 'nu metal' is it's different. And you've got so many different influences." The Smashing Pumpkins vocalist Billy Corgan praised nu metal, saying "I think it’s fantastic. I think the more people are cross-pollenating between different musical styles… it not only has musical implications but it has cultural ones as well."

Jack Porter of The Michigan Daily defended , writing

Usage of nu metal label from nu metal musicians
Some nu metal musicians have rejected the label nu metal and have tried to distance themselves from it. Slipknot prefer to distance themselves from other nu metal groups, describing their own music as "metal metal" and equate their link to nu metal as a coincidence of their time of emergence.

Jonathan Davis had originally rejected the nu metal label, saying "We're not 'rap rock,' we're not 'nu-metal ... We might have invented a new genre of heavy music or rock, but I believe the term 'nu-metal' was made up for all the bands that followed us. Those guys to me are nu-metal. And we're just Korn." In 2014, Davis spoke about the nu metal label, saying:

Davis has since become more accepting of the term. In a 2019 interview, he remarked, "if we invented nu-metal then fuck yeah, cool. It’s pretty cool to say we helped invent some kind of movement, that’s pretty insane."

Staind's vocalist Aaron Lewis rejected the nu metal label, saying, "if we get called a 'nu metal' band one more time, I don't even know what I'm going to do!" In 2003, Chino Moreno, vocalist of Deftones, rejected the nu metal label saying "We told motherfuckers not to lump us in with nu metal because when those bands go down we aren't going to be with them". As Deftones abandoned the nu metal sound of their early work, Moreno tried to distance himself from nu metal bands and began to criticize the bands and their albums, including Korn's 2002 album Untouchables; he said, "As Korn go on, it's the same things—bad childhoods and mean moms. It gets too old after a while. How old is Jonathan [Davis]? Thirty? How long has it been since he lived with his parents?" Davis responded saying, "Obviously, Chino hasn't listened to the words on the rest of my albums because they're nothing about my parents or my childhood." Moreno also said, "A big problem for me was opening for Limp Bizkit and Linkin Park, two bands that wouldn't exist if it weren't for me, straight up!". Mike Shinoda of Linkin Park spoke about the nu metal label in an interview with NME, saying "We never held the flag for nu-metal—it was associated with frat rock. Arrogant, misogynistic, and full of testosterone; we were reacting against that." Wes Borland of Limp Bizkit said that he "never liked or condoned" the term "nu metal" in any way, and said he does not understand "how so many bands that sound nothing alike can be put into" the nu metal genre. Mike Wengren of Disturbed said that he doesn't think Disturbed "were ever a nu-metal band to begin with".

Chester Bennington of Linkin Park initially disliked the band being labeled as nu metal, saying in 2007, "I know that we kind of helped create, I guess, the sound of that genre, but I hate that genre. I'm not going to speak for everyone, but I can personally tell you that I am not a big fan of almost everybody in that category. There are a few bands that I don't really believe belong in there, and we're one of those bands." However, by 2012 Bennington said he accepted the nu metal label:

Association with heavy metal
In addition to criticizing nu metal, many heavy metal musicians have rejected nu metal as a legitimate subgenre of heavy metal, saying it is not "true heavy metal". Some nu metal musicians have tried to distance themselves from being heavy metal at all. For example, Korn's Jonathan Davis rejected the "heavy metal" label. When talking with Vice, Davis spoke about Korn being called a heavy metal band, saying, "I never thought of us to be metal to begin with. Yeah, we're heavy and downtuned, but metal, to me, is like Judas Priest and Iron Maiden. That's metal, man. I always thought of us as a funk band. That funky, groovy shit." Godsmack's vocalist Sully Erna also rejected the "heavy metal" label and said he views Godsmack as a hard rock band. Though he was originally more tolerant of the concept, Linkin Park's vocalist Chester Bennington, though eventually accepting of the nu metal label, had expressed some disagreement with his band being labeled a heavy metal or nu metal group because he felt the term limited the scope of the band's actual style, particularly on their later albums. He elaborated:

See also
 List of nu metal bands
 New wave of American heavy metal

References

Further reading

External links

They Did It All for the Nookie: Decibel Explores the Rise and Fall of Nu-Metal - Decibel
Heavy Metal Classifications: A History of Nu Metal - Metal Descent
The anatomy of a scene: Charting the rise, dominance and fall of nü metal - Firstpost
Vintage Korn: Life Is Peachy At 20 - MTV
`Numetal' Blends Hip-hop, Rock  - Sun Sentinel

 
Music of California
American styles of music
American rock music genres
Alternative metal genres
1990s in music
2000s in music
1990s fads and trends
2000s fads and trends
Fusion music genres
20th-century music genres
21st-century music genres
Heavy metal genres
Alternative rock genres